Madlib Remixes is a compilation of early hip hop tracks remixed by hip hop producer Madlib released as a 12-inch EP in 2000.  Madlib originally intended the remixes for personal use but decided to independently release them (No Label Records is just a comical reference). The vinyl LP was re-issued by Madlib on August 1, 2008.

Track listing
All tracks mixed, produced, composed, and arranged by Madlib.

References

Madlib albums